The Pratt & Whitney JT9D engine was the first high bypass ratio jet engine to power a wide-body airliner. Its initial application was the Boeing 747-100, the original "Jumbo Jet". It was Pratt & Whitney's first high-bypass-ratio turbofan.

Development

The JT9D program was launched in September 1965 and the first engine was tested in December 1966.
It received its FAA certification in May 1969 and entered service in January 1970 on the Boeing 747.
It subsequently powered the Boeing 767, Airbus A300 and Airbus A310, and McDonnell Douglas DC-10.
The enhanced JT9D-7R4 was introduced in September 1982 and was approved for 180-minute ETOPS for twinjets in June 1985. By 2020, the JT9D had flown more than 169 million hours.
Production ceased in 1990, to be replaced by the new PW4000.

The JT9D was developed from the STF200/JTF14 demonstrator engines. The JTF14 engine had been proposed for the C-5 Galaxy program but the production contract was awarded to the General Electric TF39. The engine's first test run took place in a test rig at East Hartford, Connecticut, with the engine's first flight in June 1968 mounted on a Boeing B-52E which served as a JT9D flying testbed.
In 1968, its unit cost was $800,000, $ million today.

Design

The JT9D introduced advanced technologies in structures, aerodynamics, and materials, which included titanium alloys and nickel alloys, to improve fuel efficiency and reliability compared to the Pratt & Whitney JT3D earlier turbofan.
The engine featured a single-stage fan, a three-stage low-pressure compressor, and an eleven-stage high-pressure compressor coupled to a two-stage high-pressure turbine and four-stage low-pressure turbine.

Pratt & Whitney faced difficulties with the JT9D design during the Boeing 747 test program. Engine failures during the flight test program resulted in thirty aircraft being parked outside the factory with concrete blocks hanging from the pylons, awaiting redesigned engines.
Boeing and Pratt & Whitney worked together in 1969 to solve the problem. The trouble was traced to ovalization, in which stresses during takeoff caused the engine casing to deform into an oval shape resulting in rubbing of high-pressure turbine blade tips. This was solved by strengthening the engine casing and adding yoke-shaped thrust links.

JT9D engines powering USAF Boeing E-4A airborne command posts were designated F105.

Variants
All variants have the same number of compressor and turbine stages.

Applications
 Airbus A300
 Airbus A310
 Boeing 747-100/200/300/SP
 Boeing 767 (early models)
 Boeing RC-1
 McDonnell Douglas DC-10-40

Specifications (JT9D-7R4)

See also

References

External links

 

High-bypass turbofan engines
JT9D
1960s turbofan engines